Rod Salka (born February 28, 1983) is an American professional boxer and politician.

Background
Born and raised in Bunola, Pennsylvania, Salka served ten years as part of the United States National Guard, joining in 2001. In 2016, he ran as a Republican in the 38th House District of Pennsylvania.

Professional career

Salka vs. García
Salka is most notable for facing light welterweight world champion Danny García on August 9, 2014, a fight in which Salka was brutally knocked out in two rounds. Before and after the event, the fight was heavily criticized by boxing observers as a mismatch.

Salka vs. Vargas
On April 12, 2018, Salka faced former super featherweight world champion Francisco Vargas. During the fight, Salka created controversy by wearing trunks featuring a red, white and blue brick wall pattern and the phrase "America 1st", a reference to Donald Trump's proposed border wall and slogan and policy. Salka would go on to retire on his stool at the end of round six, after being knockdown down by a Vargas combination which left him cut over his left eye.

Professional boxing record

References

External links

Living people
Super-featherweight boxers
Lightweight boxers
Light-welterweight boxers

1983 births
American male boxers
Boxers from Pennsylvania
Pennsylvania Republicans
Politicians from Allegheny County, Pennsylvania